In calculus, a one-sided limit refers to either one of the two limits of a function  of a real variable  as  approaches a specified point either from the left or from the right.

The limit as  decreases in value approaching  ( approaches  "from the right" or "from above") can be denoted::

The limit as  increases in value approaching  ( approaches  "from the left" or "from below") can be denoted:

In some cases in which the limit

does not exist, the two one-sided limits nonetheless exist.  Consequently, the limit as  approaches  is sometimes called a "two-sided limit".  

It is possible for exactly one of the two one-sided limits to exist (while the other does not exist). It is also possible for neither of the two one-sided limits to exist.

Formal definition

Definition

and the left-sided limit as  approaches  can be rigorously defined as the value  that satisfies:

We can represent the same thing more symbolically, as follows.

Intuition

In comparison to the formal definition for the limit of a function at a point, the one-sided limit (as the name would suggest) only deals with input values to one side of the approached input value.

For reference, the formal definition for the limit of a function at a point is as follows:

To define a one-sided limit, we must modify this inequality.

Examples

Example 1: 

Similarly,  since all values of  satisfy  (said differently,  is always positive) as  approaches  from the right, which implies that  is always negative so that  diverges to  

Example 2: 
To calculate these limits, first show that 

(which is true because )
so that consequently, 

whereas 
 because the denominator diverges to infinity; that is, because  
Since  the limit  does not exist.

Relation to topological definition of limit

The one-sided limit to a point  corresponds to the general definition of limit, with the domain of the function restricted to one side, by either allowing that the function domain is a subset of the topological space, or by considering a one-sided subspace, including  Alternatively, one may consider the domain with a half-open interval topology.

Abel's theorem

A noteworthy theorem treating one-sided limits of certain power series at the boundaries of their intervals of convergence is Abel's theorem.

Notes

References

See also
 Projectively extended real line
 Semi-differentiability
 Limit superior and limit inferior

Real analysis
Limits (mathematics)
Functions and mappings